African yellow white-eye has been split into four species:
 Forest white-eye, Zosterops stenocricotus
 Green white-eye, Zosterops stuhlmanni
 Northern yellow white-eye, Zosterops senegalensis
 Southern yellow white-eye,  Zosterops anderssoni

Birds by common name